Mar Joseph II Sliba Marouf (or Youssef II Sliba Bet Macruf) was the second incumbent of the Josephite line of Church of the East, a little patriarchate in full communion with the pope active in the areas of Amid and Mardin in the 17th–19th century. He was the patriarch of the Chaldean Catholic Church from 1696 to 1713.

Life
Sliba Marouf was born in 1667 in Tel Keppe, Ottoman Empire, received first orders at fourteen, and was consecrated bishop, without the previous consent of Rome, at the age of 24 in 1691 by Joseph I. He was chosen by Joseph I as his successor in 1694, but this appointment became effective only when Rome accepted his predecessor's resignation in 1696. Thus Sliba Marouf was confirmed patriarch by Holy See on June 18, 1696, with the name of Joseph II.

As happened for Joseph I, his ministry had to face the strong opposition of the traditionalists. This forced him in 1708 to ask permission of Rome to resign and move to Italy, a request that was not granted.

During the plague that spread from 1708 he distinguish himself for the help and the pastoral care he offered to the sick until he too was infected.
Early in 1713 he chose as successor Timothy Maroge and died of plague a few months later in 1713 (or according to other sources in 1712) at the age of 46.

Works
Joseph is remembered as a Syriac and Arabic writer and for having translated many texts from Latin. His Speculum tersum (Book of the pure Mirror) was translated from Syriac into Latin by I. A. Assemani and is conserved in the Vatican Library.

Notes

Sources
 
 

Chaldean Catholic Patriarchs of Babylon
1667 births
1713 deaths
17th-century Eastern Catholic archbishops
18th-century Eastern Catholic archbishops
17th-century people from the Ottoman Empire
18th-century people from the Ottoman Empire
Bishops in the Ottoman Empire
17th-century Arabic writers
Syriac writers
18th-century Arabic writers
Assyrians from the Ottoman Empire